Transtillaspis scyruncus is a species of moth of the family Tortricidae. It is found in Morona-Santiago Province, Ecuador.

The wingspan is 24 mm. The ground colour of the forewings is pale ferruginous brown, strigulated (finely streaked) with blackish. The hindwings are cream mixed with brownish.

Etymology
The species name refers to the strong sclerites of the genitalia and is derived from Greek skyros (meaning strong).

References

Moths described in 2013
Transtillaspis
Taxa named by Józef Razowski